Kevin Manuel Rivera Serrano (born 28 June 1998 in Cartago) is a Costa Rican cyclist, who last rode for UCI ProTeam .

Major results

2017
 1st  Overall Tour of China II
1st Stage 1
2018
 1st Stage 7 Vuelta al Táchira
2019
 1st  Overall Sibiu Cycling Tour
1st  Young rider classification
1st Stage 2
 3rd Overall Tour of China II
1st  Mountains classification
1st Stage 3 
 9th Milano–Torino
 10th Overall Tour of Bihor
1st  Young rider classification
2020
 1st Stage 4 Tour de Langkawi
 3rd Overall Vuelta al Táchira
1st  Young rider classification
1st  Mountains classification
1st Stages 6 (ITT) & 7
2022
 1st Stage 4 Vuelta a Costa Rica

References

External links

1998 births
Living people
Costa Rican male cyclists
People from Cartago Province